Full Force Galesburg is the fourth studio album by the Mountain Goats, released in 1997.

It consists of songs written and recorded by John Darnielle. Darnielle has stated that most, if not all, of the album was written in Grinnell, Iowa. Most of the songs were performed by Darnielle singing and playing guitar solo, and recorded on his Panasonic RX-FT500 boom box; however, several songs also feature stringed instrumentation from Alastair Galbraith. Nothing Painted Blue's Peter Hughes adds backing vocals and guitar work on a few tracks as well.

Track listing

Personnel
John Darnielle - vocals, guitar
Alastair Galbraith - violin (13, 15)
Peter Hughes - vocals, electric guitar
Bob Durkee - organ

References

External links 
Complete lyrics to the album

1997 albums
The Mountain Goats albums